60 Seconds of Solitude in Year Zero is a 2011 anthology film, a one-time-only event that took place in the Port of Tallinn, Estonia on 22 December 2011. The film is a collection of one-minute short films created by 60 filmmakers from around the world on the theme of the death of cinema.

The project, developed as an ode to 35mm film and dedicated to preserving the freedom of thought in cinema, was conceived by Veiko Õunpuu with Taavi Eelmaa and funded by the 2011 European Capital of Culture Tallinn, the Estonian Ministry of Culture and the EU-Japan Fest Committee.

Content

Directors

Phie Ambo (Denmark)
Shinji Aoyama (Japan)
Jes Benstock (UK)
Mark Boswell (USA)
Mark Cousins (Ireland)
Maxì Dejoie (Italy)
Gustav Deutsch (Austria)
Feyyaz (Germany)
Michael Glawogger (Austria)
Jorge Michel Grau (Mexico)
Malcolm Le Grice (UK)
Jan Ijäs (Finland)
Ishii Gakuryu (Japan) 
Jeon Kyu-hwan (South Korea)
Jussi Jaakola (Finland)
Ken Jacobs (USA)
Vimukthi Jayasundara (Sri Lanka)
Woo Ming Jin (Malaysia)
Viktor Kaganovich (Ukraine)
Kang Kiyoung aka Dalpalan (South Korea)
Tolga Karaçelik (Turkey)
Manuela Kaufmann (Italy)
Naomi Kawase (Japan)
Ville Kerimaa (Finland)
Eric Khoo (Singapore)
Kim Jee-woon (South Korea)
Aku Louhimies (Finland)

Ari Alexander Ergis Magnússon (Iceland)
Marina Manushenko (Switzerland)
Bruce McClure (USA)
Brillante Mendoza (Philippines)
Kyungwon Moon (South Korea)
Amir Naderi (Iran)
Park Chan-wook (South Korea)
Rafi Pitts (Iran)
Pen-ek Ratanaruang (Thailand)
Jussi Reittu (Finland)
Simon Rumley (UK)
Albert Serra (Spain)
Ronni Shendar (Israel)
Norbert Shieh (USA)
Hafsteinn Gunnar Sigurðsson (Iceland)
Auraeus Solito (Philippines)
Mika Taanila (Finland)
Mart Taniel (Estonia)
Andres Tenusaar (Estonia)
Tom Tykwer (Germany)
Gillian Wearing (UK)
Gereon Wetzel (Germany)
Oliver Whitehead (Finland)
Adam Wingard (USA)
Edmund Yeo (Malaysia/Japan)
Kari Yli-Annala (Finland)
Brian Yuzna (USA)
Veiko Õunpuu (Estonia)

References

External links

2011 films
2010s avant-garde and experimental films
2011 independent films
Anthology films
Films directed by Vimukthi Jayasundara